Avenida de Almeida Ribeiro, also commonly known as San Ma Lo ("new street"), is the main avenue in the heart of Macau Peninsula.  The 620 metres long avenue was laid out in 1920 and it extends from the Inner to the Outer harbour, passing through the old residential area with its rows of colourful street shops.

History
The avenue used to be a small, winding alley. It was not until 1918 that buildings and hills alongside was being altered or demolished for the construction of the avenue. Then being the newest road in the city the widespread San Ma Lo name was given by locals, literally "New Road".

Shopping area
Nearby, on the lanes around the Rua das Estalagens, is a local flea market, a popular spot to look for Chinese antiques.

From Largo do Senado heading towards the Inner Harbour along the Avenida Almeida Ribeiro, a cluster of jewellery or gold shops can be easily found.  Also, antique shops can be seen near St. Paul's, along Avenida Almeida Ribeiro, on Travessa do Pagode and opposite the Kun Lam Temple. Liquors, tobacco, Portuguese wine  are largely found in many shops on Avenida de Almeida Ribeiro.

Gambling used to flourish along the avenue but most were relocated to newer, less urbanized regions like Cotai since the 1990s.

Landmarks
Avenida de Almeida Ribeiro hosts a mix of European and Chinese styled buildings along its length, most dated back to the 1920s. Historic landmarks situated there include Largo do Senado, Leal Senado Building, Macau General Post Office and Hotel Central.

Gallery

See also
 Transport in Macau

External links

Avenida de Almeida Ribeiro (Chinese)
Planet Ware: Avenida de Almeida Ribeiro
Gold shops on Avenida de Almeida Ribeiro
Shopping in Macau: Avenida de Almeida Ribeiro

Macau Peninsula
Macau
Roads in Macau